The 1940 Chicago White Sox season was the team's 40th season in the major leagues, and its 41st season overall. They finished with a record of 82–72, good enough tied for 4th place with the Boston Red Sox in the American League, 8 games behind the first place Detroit Tigers.

Offseason 
 December 8, 1939: Rip Radcliff was traded by the White Sox to the St. Louis Browns for Moose Solters.

Regular season 
 April 16, 1940: Bob Feller of the Cleveland Indians threw what is, to date, the only Opening Day no-hitter in major league history against the White Sox. Feller walked five and struck out eight as the Indians beat the White Sox 1–0 at Comiskey Park.

Season standings

Record vs. opponents

Opening Day lineup 
 Bob Kennedy, 3B
 Joe Kuhel, 1B
 Mike Kreevich, CF
 Moose Solters, LF
 Luke Appling, SS
 Taffy Wright, RF
 Eric McNair, 2B
 Mike Tresh, C
 Eddie Smith, P

Roster

Player stats

Batting 
Note: G = Games played; AB = At bats; R = Runs scored; H = Hits; 2B = Doubles; 3B = Triples; HR = Home runs; RBI = Runs batted in; BB = Base on balls; SO = Strikeouts; AVG = Batting average; SB = Stolen bases

Pitching 
Note: W = Wins; L = Losses; ERA = Earned run average; G = Games pitched; GS = Games started; SV = Saves; IP = Innings pitched; H = Hits allowed; R = Runs allowed; ER = Earned runs allowed; HR = Home runs allowed; BB = Walks allowed; K = Strikeouts

Farm system 

LEAGUE CHAMPIONS: Grand Forks

References

External links 
 1940 Chicago White Sox at Baseball Reference

Chicago White Sox seasons
Chicago White Sox season
Chicago White